Francis Montgomery "Tommy" Atkins (December 9, 1887 – May 7, 1956) was a pitcher in Major League Baseball. Atkins made one start for the Philadelphia Athletics in 1909 and a further 15 appearances (four starts) during 1910. According to the 1911 Reach Guide, Atkins had a key pitch called the "fingernail fling".

References

External links

1887 births
1956 deaths
Major League Baseball pitchers
Philadelphia Athletics players
Atlanta Crackers players
Baseball players from Nebraska
People from Ponca, Nebraska